The Strange Mr. Gregory is a 1945 American horror film, directed by Phil Rosen. It stars Edmund Lowe, Jean Rogers, and Don Douglas, and was released on November 14, 1945.

Plot
Mr. Gregory (Edmund Lowe) is a famous but reclusive magician. Through secret study over several years, he has developed certain occult powers. Under the right circumstances, he can influence the thoughts of others. He also can put his body into a kind of suspended animation to give the appearance that he is dead. 
 
Amateur magician John Randall (Don Douglas) is a great admirer of Mr. Gregory and makes an effort to meet and befriend him. Mr. Gregory, however, quickly becomes obsessed with Randall's beautiful wife, Ellen (Jean Rogers). He concocts an elaborate scheme to fake his own murder, frame Randall for the crime and win Ellen for himself. At first his plot seems to work perfectly, but he arouses the suspicions of some people he had expected to fool.

Cast list
 Edmund Lowe as Mr. Gregory aka Lane Talbot
 Jean Rogers as Ellen Randall
 Don Douglas as John Randall
 Marjorie Hoshelle as Sheila Edwards
 Jonathan Hale as Blair
 Frank Reicher as Riker
 Robert Emmett Keane as District attorney
 Frank Mayo as Inspector Hoskins
 Fred Kelsey as Detective Lefert
 Anita Turner as the maid

References

External links 
 
 
 

Films directed by Phil Rosen
1945 horror films
1945 films
American horror films
Monogram Pictures films
American black-and-white films
1940s American films